Champagne Boizel is a Champagne producer based in the Épernay region of Champagne. The house, founded in 1834, produces both vintage and non-vintage cuvee as well as a blanc de blancs Chardonnay Champagne and a rosé.

See also
 List of Champagne houses

References

Champagne producers